The 42nd Legislative Assembly of Ontario was a legislature of the province of Ontario, Canada. The membership was set by the 2018 Ontario general election and sat for two sessions until it was dissolved on May 3, 2022 in advance of the 2022 Ontario general election.

The government, a majority, was formed by the Progressive Conservative Party with leader Doug Ford serving as Premier of Ontario. The Official Opposition, and the only other recognized party, was the Ontario New Democratic Party led by Andrea Horwath. The Ontario Liberal Party and Green Party of Ontario also elected members to seats in the legislature, but neither elected enough MPPs for official party status. At dissolution, the New Blue Party of Ontario and the Ontario Party each had one MPP, but also lacked official party status.

Ford was officially sworn in as Premier of Ontario by the Lieutenant Governor of Ontario on June 29, 2018. The first session of the 42nd Legislative Assembly was opened on July 11, 2018 with the election of Ted Arnott as Speaker.

Election and appointments
The Members of the Provincial Parliament (MPP) that served in the Legislative Assembly of the 42nd Parliament of Ontario were elected in the general election held on June 7, 2018. The election returned 76 Progressive Conservatives, 40 NDP members, 7 Liberals, and 1 Green. This allowed the Progressive Conservative Party to form a majority government with its leader Doug Ford becoming Premier and the NDP forming the Official Opposition. Neither the Liberals, nor the Green Party had sufficient number of seats to provide them with party status in the legislative assembly. Ford assembled a 21-member Cabinet which was sworn in by Lieutenant Governor Elizabeth Dowdeswell on June 29. The cabinet featured Ford as Premier and Minister of Intergovernmental Affairs with former Progressive Conservative leadership candidates Christine Elliott as Deputy Premier and Minister of Health, and Caroline Mulroney as Attorney General. Former interim leaders of the Progressive Conservatives Vic Fedeli and Jim Wilson were assigned to be Minister of Finance and Minister of Economic Development, respectively. This initial cabinet also featured Lisa MacLeod as both Minister of Community and Social Services and Minister of Children and Youth Services, Lisa Thompson as Minister of Education, Rod Phillips as Minister of the Environment, and John Yakabuski as Minister of Transportation. In addition, 26 other Progressive Conservative MPPs were appointed to be parliamentary assistants. Todd Smith was appointed Government House Leader and Ted Arnott was elected Speaker.

The first change to the Cabinet came on November 2, 2018, when Jim Wilson resigned to sit as an independent and Todd Smith assumed his role as Minister of Economic Development. The first major cabinet shuffle came on June 20, 2019, as the premier expanded the cabinet to 28 members with 31 other Progressive Conservative MPPs being parliamentary assistants. Doug Downey, Paul Calandra, Stephen Lecce and Ross Romano were promoted to cabinet to be Attorney General, Government House Leader, Minister of Education, and Ministry of Training, Colleges and Universities, respectively. Jill Dunlop, Kinga Surma, and Prabmeet Sarkaria were promoted to be Associate Ministers. Rod Phillips became Minister of Finance, Jeff Yurek the Minister of the Environment, Todd Smith the Minister of Children and Youth Services, Caroline Mulroney the Minister of Transportation, Vic Fedeli the Minister of Economic Development, Lisa Thompson the Minister of Government and Consumer Services, Lisa MacLeod the Minister of Tourism, Culture and Sport, Laurie Scott the Minister of Infrastructure, and Monte McNaughton the Minister of Labour. Bill Walker and Michael Tibollo were demoted from ministerial positions to be Associate Ministers, and Christine Elliott's portfolio split with Merrilee Fullerton taking over the newly created Ministry of Long-Term Care.

In February 2021, Peter Bethlenfalvy replaced Rod Phillips as Minister of Finance following criticism of his international vacations during the COVID pandemic, though he returned to cabinet in June as the Minister of Long-Term Care. That June shuffle removed 5 members (Jeff Yurek, John Yakabuski, Laurie Scott, Bill Walker, and Ernie Hardeman) and introduced 6 new members to cabinet, including David Piccini as Minister of the Environment, Parm Gill as Minister of Citizenship and Multiculturalism, Khaleed Rasheed as Associate Minister of Digital Government, Stan Cho as Associate Minister of Transportation, Nina Tangri as Associate Minister for Small Business and Red Tape Reduction, and Jane McKenna as the Associate Minister of Children and Women's Issues. Kinga Surma and Jill Dunlop were promoted from their associate minister roles to be Minister of Infrastructure and Minister of Colleges and Universities, respectively, with Prabmeet Sakaria being promoted from associate minister to President of the Treasury Board.

First session

2018-19
The first session of the 42nd Parliament began on July 11, 2018, with the Speech from the Throne delivered by Lieutenant Governor Dowdeswell on behalf of the Premier Ford and the Progressive Conservative government. In the summer session two bills were adopted. The first bill, adopted by the Parliament on July 26, was the Urgent Priorities Act (Bill 2) which enacted back-to-work legislation to end strike action at York University, canceled the White Pines wind project, and required Hydro One create new compensation packages for their chief executive officer and board of directors which would be subject to government approval. The second bill, titled Better Local Government Act, 2018 (Bill 5) removed the City of Toronto's powers to determine the composition of City Council and the division of the City into wards and replaced it with a requirement that the City's wards follow the provincial riding boundaries, as well as eliminate elected chair positions in the regions of Peel, York, Niagara and Muskoka, in favour of appointed positions — all applicable to the 2018 municipal elections.

In the fall 2018 sitting of the first session, seven more bills were adopted. Bill 4 repealed the province's emissions trading legislation, the Climate Change Mitigation and Low-Carbon Economy Act and Bill 34 repealed the Green Energy Act. Bill 32 amended the Ontario Energy Board Act to spread of the cost of expanding the natural gas distribution system to all rate-payers rather than those immediately benefiting from the expansion. Bill 47, Making Ontario Open for Business Act, retracted the planned 2019 increase to the minimum wage while tying future increases to a calculation of inflation, replaced a mandatory provision for all employees to be provided two paid sick days with unpaid leave days, eliminated mandatory pay-equity for part-time and casual workers, deleted the allowance of a trade union to obtain a list of employees and closed the Ontario College of Trades. Bill 57 was an omnibus bill that made numerous amendments to various acts, including closing the office of the Provincial Advocate for Children and Youth, and the office of the Environmental Commissioner, repeals the Ontario Place Corporation Act and the Trillium Trust Act, expanding the area Metrolinx provides service to while deleting the requirement that it consider all forms of transportation it is plans, exempting the Royal Canadian Legion from property taxes, allowing professional full-time fire-fighters to also work part-time at a different fire department, increasing the maximum allowable contributions that can be made to political parties while removing the prohibition of MLAs from attending fund-raising events, proclaiming March 27, 2019, to be Special Hockey Day, creating a Low-Income Individuals and Families tax credit, closing the offices of the Conflict of Interest Commissioner and the French Language Services Commissioner while moving their duties to the offices of the Integrity Commissioner and the Ombudsman, respectively. Also, Bill 36 created a licensing system for private cannabis retail stores and allowed cannabis consumption in all areas where the smoking of tobacco is allowed and Bill 67 disallowed strike action by the unionized workers of the Ontario Power Generation.

In the spring 2019 sitting, several more bills were adopted. The Restoring Ontario's Competitiveness Act (Bill 66) was another omnibus bill that amended numerous unrelated acts, as well as repealed the Pawnbrokers Act, the Toxics Reduction Act, 2009, and the Wireless Services Agreements Act, 2013. Bill 48 amended several education-related acts to make provisions for service animals in schools, require applicants for the Ontario College of Teachers to demonstrate proficiency in mathematics, and amend the provisions regarding teacher-student sexual abuse. Bill 68 repealed and replaced the Police Services Act and the Police Oversight Act with the Community Safety and Policing Act and the Special Investigations Unit Act. In addition to repealing the Lung Health Act, Bill 74 enacted the Connecting Care Act to create a new Crown agency titled Ontario Health intended to merge the 14 Local Health Integration Network and several crown agencies such as Cancer Care Ontario, the Gift of Life Network, eHealth Ontario, HealthForceOntario, and provide the ability for the government to create Integrated Care Delivery Systems (or Health Teams) to deliver health care services. Bill 115 terminated the province's agreement with The Beer Store in favour of making alcoholic beverages available for sale through grocery stores and convenience outlets. Bill 107 transferred, to Metrolinx from the City of Toronto, the responsibility for designing and developing rapid transit within the city. Bill 108 amended 13 acts, including the Endangered Species Act by inserting new abilities for the Ministry of the Environment to delay listing species on the endangered list and provide exemptions from the protections under the act for listed species, the Environmental Assessment Act by allowing for exemptions to routine class environmental assessments, the Ontario Heritage Act by creating a formal process for property owners to appeal a heritage designation, the Development Charges Act and Planning Act regarding what and how certain services may be charged development cost charges, community benefits charges and municipal parkland acquisitions, allow for inclusionary zoning and create lower timelines for local governments to decide on rezoning and subdivision applications, and the Local Planning Appeal Tribunal Act by amending the practices and procedures of the tribunal.

Few bills were adopted during the fall 2019 sitting but they amended, created or repealed numerous acts. Bill 136 repealed the Ontario Society for the Prevention of Cruelty to Animals Act and replaced it with the Provincial Animal Welfare Services Act. Bill 124 caps public sector wage increases to no more than 1% per year. Bill 138 repealed the Toronto Stock Exchange Act; enacted the Egyptian Heritage Month Act, the Hellenic Heritage Month Act, the Provincial Day of Action on Litter Act, and the Supply Chain Management (Government, Broader Public Sector and Health Sector Entities) Act; repealed and replaced the Liquor Licence Act and the Wine Content and Labelling Act with the new Liquor Licence and Control Act; amended cannabis-related acts to allow for online and telephone purchases from private cannabis retail stores and allowed peace officers and judges to refer a youth to an education program rather than pursuing conviction of a cannabis offense, and created a lower aviation fuel tax rate applicable to purchases made in Northern Ontario. Bill 132, aimed at red tape reduction eliminated or lowered certain penalties for contravening the Environmental Protection Act; repealed the Residential Complex Sales Representation Act, Local Planning Appeal Support Centre Act, Farm Products Grades and Sales Act, Partnerships for Jobs and Growth Act, Paperback and Periodical Distributors Act, Statute Labour Act, and the Freshwater Fish Marketing Act; permits Algoma University and Ontario College of Art & Design University to award degrees and diplomas in all branches of learning; and amended Pesticides Act to allow for more use of pesticides for cosmetic purposes, among other provisions.

2020-21
The legislature reconvened in  2020 but the events of the Covid pandemic came to dominant the agenda. Covid-related legislation adopted in 2020 included budgetary measures in Bill 188; Bill 186 to create an unpaid leave of absence within the Employment Standards Act for infectious disease emergencies and to repeal the SARS Assistance and Recovery Strategy Act; Bill 187 to allow local governments to hold meetings through electronic means; Bill 189 to suspend loan repayments in the Ontario Student Assistance Program; Bill 190 to allow provincially-regulated organizations to conduct business remotely (e.g. use of electronic signatures, filings, affidavits); Bills 192 & 204 to suspend evictions of commercial tenants and freeze residential rents; Bill 195 to allow the Ontario Provincial Police to enforce covid-related regulations on gatherings; Bill 218 indemnified workers and organizations from legal actions relating to covid exposures; and Bill 283 enacted the Covid-19 Vaccination Reporting Act.

Other bills adopted in 2020 included Bill 197 to amend the Environmental Assessment Act to prioritize assessments by anticipated impact, allow for a streamlined-class of assessment, and reduce mandated timelines of other assessments; amend the Planning Act addressing community benefits charges and enhancing order making powers for the minister responsible; amend the Education Act to allow for demonstration schools; create an appeal process for those denied farm business registration; amend the Payday Loans Act to cap fees for dishonoured cheques, pre-authorized debits, and loans under $1,500; create the new Transit-Oriented Communities Act; and repeal and replace the Burden Reduction Reporting Act, 2014 and the Reducing Regulatory Costs for Business Act, 2017 with the new Modernizing Ontario for People and Businesses Act, 2020. Bill 213, titled the Better for People, Smarter for Business Act, 2020 was adopted to repeal the Ontario Highway Transport Board Act, grant university status and rename several Christian colleges, remove residency requirements for corporate directors, and allow the Ministry of the Environment to levy new fees for providing documents. Bill 215 removes local government ability to regulate noise associated with the delivery of goods, and increases fines for unlicenced ridesharing. Bill 229 reduces the authority of conservation authorities and allows municipalities to opt out; removes promotion of renewable energy generation from the list of objectives of the Ontario Energy Board; exempts Army, Navy and Air Force Veterans in Canada from paying property tax; creates the "seniors' home safety tax credit"; creates iGaming as a subsidiary of the Ontario Lottery and Gaming Corporation; creates the Ontario Centres of Excellence Inc.; exempts forestry operations on crown land from complying with the Endangered Species Act; updates and modernizes the Credit Unions and Caisses Populaires Act; repeals and replaces the Film Classification Act with the new Film Content Information Act; and repeals the Financial Services Commission of Ontario Act. Bill 236 creates government regulations applicable to food delivery services.

Bills adopted in 2021 included Bill 245 which enacted the Ontario Land Tribunal Act to consolidate several different boards and tribunals into one body; Bill 251 which enacted the Anti-Human Trafficking Strategy Act and repealed and replaced the Hotel Registration of Guests Act with the Accommodation Sector Registration of Guests Act; Bill 283 which created the Health and Supportive Care Providers Oversight Authority; and Bill 282 which enacted the Towing and Storage Safety and Enforcement Act to regulate towing services. Bill 246 mandated that school buses be equipped with four overhead amber signal-lights and four overhead red signal-lights. Bills 254 and 307 brought social media accounts under the purview of the Members' Integrity Act and invoked the "notwithstanding clause" to double the amount of time spending limits are imposed on political advertising by third parties. Bill 269 created Invest Ontario and the Ontario jobs training tax credit while Bills 222 and 257 expedited certain transit and broadband projects that were deemed to be a priority. Bill 288 replaced the Ontario College of Trades with a new Crown corporation Skilled Trades Ontario. Bill 276 made the Northern Ontario School of Medicine and the Collège de Hearst into universities, dissolved the Health Professions Regulatory Advisory Council and the Ontario Drug Benefit Act'''s Pharmacy Council and a Citizens' Council, 
and created a prohibition on recordings hearings of the Landlord and Tenant Board.

Second session
Speech from the Throne was read on October 4, 2021.

Timeline of the 42nd Parliament of Ontario
The following notable events occurred during the 2018–present period:

 July 11, 2018: The 42nd Parliament of Ontario begins its first session. Ted Arnott, MPP for Wellington—Halton Hills, is elected as the Speaker of the Legislative Assembly of Ontario.
 July 12, 2018: Lieutenant Governor Elizabeth Dowdeswell addresses the speech from the throne.
November 2, 2018: Progressive Conservative MPP Jim Wilson (Simcoe—Grey) resigns from cabinet and the PC caucus after allegations of sexual misconduct.
 November 29, 2018: Progressive Conservative MPP Amanda Simard (Glengarry–Prescott–Russell) leaves the PC caucus after opposing the government's cuts to French-language services.
 February 20, 2019: Progressive Conservative MPP Randy Hillier (Lanark—Frontenac—Kingston) is suspended from the PC caucus by Premier Doug Ford for being disrespectful toward parents concerned about cuts to autism funding.
 July 31, 2019: Liberal MPP Nathalie Des Rosiers (Ottawa—Vanier) resigns from the legislature accept a position as Principal of Massey College at the University of Toronto.
 September 20, 2019: Liberal Marie-France Lalonde (Orléans) resigns from the legislature after being nominated as the Liberal Party of Canada candidate for the federal riding of Orléans in the 2019 Canadian federal election.
 January 16, 2020: Independent MPP Amanda Simard (Glengarry–Prescott–Russell) joins the Liberal caucus.
 July 21, 2020: Progressive Conservative MPP Belinda Karahalios (Cambridge) is removed from the PC caucus after voting against a government bill extending emergency powers for up to two years.
 January 15, 2021: Progressive Conservative MPP Roman Baber (York Centre) is removed from the PC caucus after releasing an open letter to end the province-wide lockdown, saying it was "deadlier than COVID".
 January 18, 2021: Independent MPP Belinda Karahalios (Cambridge) forms the New Blue Party of Ontario caucus in the Legislative Assembly.
 August 17, 2021: Liberal MPP Michael Coteau (Don Valley East) resigns to run in the 44th Canadian general election as the Liberal Party of Canada candidate for the federal riding of Don Valley East.
 August 19, 2021: Progressive Conservative MPP Rick Nicholls (Chatham-Kent-Leamington) is removed from the PC Caucus by Premier Doug Ford for failing to get vaccinated against Covid-19.
 September 12, 2021: Ford prorogues the first session and states that the Second Session will start on October 4, 2021.
 October 22, 2021: Progressive Conservative MPP Lindsey Park (Durham) resigns from the PC Caucus after allegations that she misrepresented her vaccination status to the Premier's office.
 March 17, 2022: New Democratic MPP Paul Miller (Hamilton East–Stoney Creek) is removed from the NDP caucus after it is found during vetting for re-election that he had joined an Islamophobic Facebook group.
 April 22, 2022: New Democratic MPP Kevin Yarde (Brampton North) resigned from caucus after he loses the party's nomination for re-election in a challenge.
 May 3, 2022: Lieutenant Governor Elizabeth Dowdeswell, on the advice of Premier Doug Ford, dissolves parliament in advance of the general election on June 2.

Summary of seat changes

Party standings

Membership changes

Seating planNote: Bold text designates the party leader, John Fraser serves as the Parliamentary leader of the Ontario Liberal Party as their leader does not have a seat in the Legislature. ''

List of members

Officeholders
Officeholders in the Legislature

Speaker
 Speaker of the Legislative Assembly of Ontario: Ted Arnott

Other Chair occupants
Deputy Speaker and Chair of the Committee of the Whole: Rick Nicholls (July 18, 2018 - October 5, 2021)
 Bill Walker (October 5, 2021 – present)
First Deputy Chair of the Committee of the Whole: Lisa Gretzky
Second Deputy Chair of the Committee of the Whole: Percy Hatfield
Third Deputy Chair of the Committee of the Whole: Jennifer French

Party leaders
 Premier of Ontario: Hon. Doug Ford (Progressive Conservative)
 Leader of the Opposition: Andrea Horwath (New Democratic)
 Leader of the Liberal Party: 
John Fraser (interim, June 14, 2018 - March 7, 2020; parliamentary leader, March 8, 2020 – present)
Steven Del Duca (March 7, 2020 – present) 
 Leader of the Green Party: Mike Schreiner
 Leader of the New Blue Party: Jim Karahalios

Floor leaders
 Government House Leader: Paul Calandra
 Opposition House Leader: Gilles Bisson
 Liberal House Leader: Kathleen Wynne

Whips
 Chief Government Whip: Lorne Coe
 Official Opposition Whip: John Vanthof
 Liberal Whip: Mitzie Hunter

Front benches
 Ford Ministry
 Official Opposition Shadow Cabinet of the 42nd Legislative Assembly of Ontario

References

External links
 Legislative Assembly of Ontario.

Terms of the Legislative Assembly of Ontario
2018 establishments in Ontario
2022 disestablishments in Ontario
2018 in Canadian politics
2019 in Canadian politics
2020 in Canadian politics
2018 in Ontario
2019 in Ontario
2020 in Ontario
2021 in Canadian politics
2022 in Canadian politics